The British Academy Children and Young People Award for Feature Film is an award presented annually by the British Academy of Film and Television Arts (BAFTA). It is given to "feature length content of any genre with a specific appeal to children and young people". Films with a certificate of U, PG, 12, 12A or 15 may be considered. The category includes international films that have been released in the United Kingdom on any platform. It was first presented at the 4th British Academy Children's Awards in 1999, with American comedy film Paulie being the first recipient.

While no film can win the award more than once, several film series have been nominated multiple times such as the entire The Lord of the Rings film series, seven out of eight of the Harry Potter films and three of the four Toy Story films. Out of the twenty-two winners, fourteen have been animated films while eight have been live-action ones.

Winners and nominees

1990s

2000s

2010s

2020s

Note: The films that don't have recipients on the tables had Production team credited as recipients for the award or nomination.

References

External links
Official website

Feature Film